Mazegh-e Bala (also Romanized as Māzegh-e Bālā and Māzegh Bālā; also known as Mazagh, Māzigh, and Mazīq) is a village in Tiab Rural District, in the Central District of Minab County, Hormozgan Province, Iran. At the 2006 census, its population was 1,253, in 245 families.

References 

Populated places in Minab County